Reginald Otto Kapp (2 August 1885-20 February 1966) was a professor of electrical engineering at UCL.

He was appointed to the Pender chair in 1935.

References

External links 
www.reginaldkapp.org
Portrait in the National Portrait Gallery

Electrical engineers
1885 births
1966 deaths
Electrical engineering academics
Academics of University College London